Route 203 is a provincial highway located in the Montérégie region of Quebec south of Montreal. The highway starts from the Canada–United States border south of Havelock at the north end of County Road 10 at Cannon Corners at the Cannon Corners-Covey Hill Border Crossing in Mooers, NY. From there, it proceeds north toward Saint-Chrysostome, from there it follows the north shore of the Rivière des Anglais until it connects with Route 138 in Très-Saint-Sacrement just northeast of the enclaved municipality of Howick.

Municipalities along Route 203
 Havelock
 Saint-Chrysostome
 Howick
 Très-Saint-Sacrement

Major intersections

See also
 List of Quebec provincial highways

References

External links
 Official Transports Quebec road map 
Route 203 on Google Maps

203